Verhavert is a surname. Notable people with the surname include:

Henri Verhavert (1874–1955), Belgian gymnast and military General
Roland Verhavert (1927–2014), Belgian film director

Surnames of Belgian origin